The Mirror of Production is a 1973 book by the French sociologist and philosopher Jean Baudrillard. It is a systematic critique of Marxism. Baudrillard's thesis is that Karl Marx’s theory of historical materialism is too rooted in assumptions and values of political economy which Marx attempted to critique to provide a sufficient framework for radical action. The fault of Marxism is in prioritizing the very concepts that founded capital, e.g. necessity, value, and labor. 

For Baudrillard, Marx did not transcend political economy but merely saw its reverse or its “mirror” side. Marxism merely strengthens political economy’s basic propositions, in particular the idea that self-creation is performed through productive, non-alienated labor. In Baudrillard’s words, “[Marxism] convinces men that they are alienated by the sale of their labor power, thus censoring the much more radical hypothesis that they might be alienated as labor power.”  Baudrillard proposes to liberate workers from their "labor value" and think in terms other than production.

See also 
 Critique of political economy
 Moishe Postone
 Robert Kurz
Mirror stage

References

External links
Jean Baudrillard, The Mirror of Production, trans. Mark Poster (New York: Telos Press, 1975)

1973 non-fiction books
Books about Marxism
Books by Jean Baudrillard
French non-fiction books

Critique of political economy